Coopetition or co-opetition (sometimes spelled "coopertition" or "co-opertition") is a neologism coined to describe cooperative competition. Coopetition is a portmanteau of cooperation and competition. Basic principles of co-opetitive structures have been described in game theory, a scientific field that received more attention with the book Theory of Games and Economic Behavior in 1944 and the works of John Forbes Nash on non-cooperative games. Coopetition occurs both at inter-organizational or intra-organizational levels.

Overview
The concept and term coopetition and its variants have been re-coined several times in history.

The concept appeared as early as 1913, being used to describe the relationships among proximate independent dealers of the Sealshipt Oyster System, who were instructed to cooperate for the benefit of the system while competing with each other for customers in the same city.

Inter-organizational 
The term and the ideas around co-opetition gained wide attention within the business community after the publication in 1996 of the book by Brandenberger and Nalebuff bearing the same title. Until today this remains the reference work for both researchers and practitioners alike.

Giovanni Battista Dagnino and Giovanna Padula's conceptualized in their conference paper (2002) that, at the inter-organisational level, coopetition occurs when companies interact with partial congruence of interests. They cooperate with each other to reach a higher value creation, if compared to the value created without interaction, and struggle to achieve a competitive advantage.

Often coopetition takes place when companies that are in the same market work together in the exploration of knowledge and research of new products, at the same time that they compete for the market-share of their products and in the exploitation of the knowledge created. In this case, the interactions occur simultaneously and in different levels in the value chain. This is the case in the arrangement between PSA Peugeot Citroën and Toyota to share components for a new city car—simultaneously sold as the Peugeot 107, the Toyota Aygo, and the Citroën C1, where companies save money on shared costs while remaining fiercely competitive in other areas.

Several advantages can be foreseen, such as cost reductions, resources complementarity and technological transfer. Some difficulties also exist, such as distribution of control, equity in risk, complementary needs and trust.

It is possible for more than two companies to be involved in coopetition with one another. Another possible case for coopetition is joint resource management in construction. Sadegh Asgari and his colleagues  (2013) present a short-term partnering case in which construction contractors form an alliance, agreeing to put all or some of their resources in a joint pool for a fixed duration of time and to allocate the group resources using a more cost-effective plan.

Marcello Mariani (2007) examined that in practice policy makers and regulators can trigger, promote, and affect coopetitive interactions among economic actors that did not intentionally plan to coopete before the external institutional stakeholders (i.e., a policy maker or regulator) created the conditions for the emergence of coopetititon.

Sadegh Asgari, Abbas Afshar and Kaveh Madani (2014) suggested cooperative game theory as the basis for fair and efficient allocation of the incremental benefits of cooperation among the cooperating contractors. Their study introduced a new paradigm in construction resource planning and allocation. Contractors no longer see each other as just competitors; they look for cooperation beyond their competition in order to reduce their costs.

Intra-organizational 
At the intra-organizational level, coopetition occurs between individuals or functional units within the same organization. Based on game theory and social interdependence theories, some studies investigate the presence of simultaneous cooperation and competition among functional units, the antecedents of coopetition, and its impact on knowledge sharing behaviors. For example, the concept of coopetitive knowledge sharing is developed to explain mechanisms through which coopetition influences effective knowledge sharing practices in cross-functional teams. The underlying argument is that while organizational teams need to cooperate, they are likely to experience tension caused by diverse professional philosophies and competing goals from different cross-functional representatives.

Examples 
 In 1913 by the Sealshipt Oyster System
 In 1937 by Rockwell D. Hunt
 Around 1975 by Doug Chamberlin in a class at Adrian College, responding to an instructor's request for an appropriate new word with which to refer to "conflict over how to divide up the benefits produced by cooperation". Incorporated in 1981 college textbook Thinking About Politics: American Government in Associational Perspective (N.Y: D. Van Nostrand, 1981), chapter 9, p. 257.
 In the decade of the 1980s, V. Frank Asaro wrote and circulated his 314-page non-fiction work Between Order and Chaos is Coopetition, aka Balance Between Order and Chaos, which culminated in a letter from best-selling author Spencer Johnson dated February 9, 1990, urging its publication. This resulted in the later publication of Universal Co-opetition; The Tortoise Shell Game, a novelization of co-opetition; and the non-fiction A Primal Wisdom (2014), corollary to the novel. (2nd. Ed., Finalist 2015 USA Best Book Awards for nonfiction and philosophy.)
 Around 1992 by Raymond Noorda to characterize Novell's business strategy.
 In 1995, Daniel Ervin, CEO of Phoenix Fire Inc., which is an international business development agency that focuses on building business partner channels for technology companies, started using the word Coopertition to describe the approach of creating a partnership between two or more competing software vendors. This type of partnership enables vendors with nominal overlap in their solution portfolio to quickly gain more market share together than when they are operating apart.
 In 2000, FIRST Robotics Competition had a competition game titled Co-Opertition FIRST. In 2009, FIRST cofounder Dean Kamen received a patent titled "Method for Creating Coopertition" (spelled as one word, with no hyphen), which involves giving FIRST Robotics teams some points scored by other teams, to encourage cooperation even as they compete. US FIRST now claims a trademark on the term on its Web site.
 In the mid-2000s, "coopetition" began to be used by Darrell Waltrip to describe the phenomenon of drivers cooperating at various phases of a race at "high speed" tracks such as Daytona and Talladaga where cooperative aerodynamic drafting is critical to a driver's ability to advance through the field. The ultimate goal for each driver, however, is to use the strategy to win.
 One of the examples of coopetition in practice in high technology context is the collaborative joint venture formed by Samsung Electronics and Sony formed in 2004 for the development and manufacturing of flat-screen LCD Panels. Coopetition is becoming more critical in high technology contexts because of several challenges such as shrinking product life cycles, need for heavy investments in research and development, convergence of multiple technologies, and importance of technological standards. While it is quite challenging to engage in coopetition (or cooperate with a competitor), coopetition engagements are helpful for firms to address major technological challenges, to create benefits for partnering firms, and to advance technological innovations that benefit the firms, the industry, and consumers.
 In 2009, the importance of coopetition was emphasized for Small and Medium-Sized Enterprises (SMEs). As technological battles intensify and technologies become more complex, SMEs face numerous challenges such as rising R&D costs, high risk and uncertainty in technological development, and lack of resources to pursue large-scale innovation projects. SMEs can more effectively deal with these problems if they work together by combining their own resources and expertise and develop their collective ability so that they can compete effectively with large firms and advance technologies they may not be able to advance alone.
 In 2012 and 2013, the concept of 'Coopetitive Knowledge Sharing' was inspired by inter-organization research literature toward developing a Coopetitive Model of Knowledge Sharing that explains (1) how coopetition should be conceptualized, (2) What forms coopetition (three formative constructs of outcome (goal, reward), means (task related), boundary (friendship, geographical closeness, sense of team belonging) interdependencies), and (3) How coopetition and its interrelated components interact and influence knowledge sharing behaviors in cross-functional software teams. This series of publications in the Journal of Systems and Software and Information Processing & Management conceptualize and operationalize the multi-dimensional construct of cross-functional coopetition, and present an instrument for measuring this construct. Cross-functional coopetition is conceptualized with five distinct and independent constructs, three of them are related to cross-functional cooperation (task orientation, communication, interpersonal relationships), and two are associated with cross-functional competition (tangible resources and intangible resources).
 In 2013 Compassion Games International, an activity of the Charter for Compassion, used "coopetition" to describe their annual games between cities about who can commit the most acts of kindness and compassion.
 In 2014 the Caring Citizens' Congress, an Empathy Surplus Project, used "coopetition" to describe how to create "compassion primaries," where candidates for party office try to find allies in the other parties to cooperate around advancing freedom, compassion and human rights as governing principles.

See also 
 Competitive altruism
 Frenemy
 Cartels are not an example of coopetition because their goal is to limit competition, and the goal of coopetition is to take advantage of the complementary resources of the firms in order to reach lower costs and manage new innovation possibilities, still regarding competition in a further moment.
 Negarchy
 Co-Opertition FIRST
 Philosophy of FIRST

References

Further reading 
 Brandenburger, Adam; Nalebuff, Barry (1996). Co-Opetition: A Revolution Mindset That Combines Competition and Cooperation 
 Bengtsson, M.; Kock, S. (2000). Coopetition in Business Networks: To Cooperate and Compete Simultaneously Industrial Marketing Management, Vol. 29, pp. 411–426
 Asaro, V. Frank (2011). Universal Co-opetition: Nature's Fusion of Cooperation and Competition. .
 Asaro, V. Frank (2012). The Tortoise Shell Code, a novel. 
 Asaro, V. Frank (2014). A Primal Wisdom: Nature's Unification of Cooperation and Competition. 
 Asaro, V. Frank (2015). The Tortoise Shell Game. 
 Asaro, V. Frank (2015). A Primal Wisdom, 2nd edition 
 
 
 
 Czakon, W.; Fernandez, A. S.; Minà, A. (2014). Editorial–From paradox to practice: the rise of coopetition strategies. International Journal of Business Environment, 6(1), 1-10.
 Mariani, M., Kylänen, M. (2014). The relevance of public-private partnerships in coopetition: Empirical evidence from the tourism sector, International Journal of Business Environment, 6(1), 106–125.
 Mariani, M. (2016). Coordination in inter-network co-opetitition: Evidence from the tourism sector, Industrial Marketing Management, 53, 103-123.
 Mariani, M. (2018). The role of policy makers and regulators in coopetition. In Fernandez, A.S., Chiambaretto, P., Le Roy, F., Czakon, W. (eds.), The Routledge Companion to Coopetition Strategy. London: Routledge, pp. 105–116.

External links 
 Strategic co-opetition: The value of relationships in the networked economy, a perspective from IBM
 The website to accompany the book Co-opetition by Adam M. Brandenburger and Barry J. Nalebuff
 Summary of Co-opetition: A Revolutionary Mindset That Combines Competition and Cooperation by Brandenburger and Nalebuff, 1998.
 Channel Register: The ugly truth about coopetition
 Coopetition in the new economy: Collaboration Among Competitors
 FIRST Values: Coopertition
 2010 FIRST Robotics Competition:Coopertition Award
 Patent 7,507,169: Method for Creating Coopertition

Business models
Imperfect competition
Game theory